Australonoe willani is a species of marine annelids in the family Polynoidae (scale worms), and the sole member of the genus Australonoe, known only from the south-east Indian Ocean at Rottnest Island, Western Australia.

Description 
The body is short, with 39 segments bearing 16 pairs of elytra. The anterior margin of the prostomium has a pair of acute anterior peaks. The lateral antennae are inserted ventrally (beneath prostomium and median antenna). Palps, antennae, dorsal and ventral cirri bear papillae. The notochaetae are about as thick as the neurochaetae. Unidentate  (lacking a secondary tooth at the tips) and bidentate neurochaetae present. In life, the species has a reddish prostomium with the rest of body and elytra orange.

References 

Phyllodocida
Animals described in 1993
Polychaete genera
Monotypic annelid genera